John Thompson Mercer (27 March 1877–1947) was an Irish footballer who played in the Football League for Derby County and Leicester Fosse.

References

1877 births
1947 deaths
Irish association footballers (before 1923)
Association football forwards
English Football League players
Ligoniel F.C. players
Preston North End F.C. players
Lisburn Distillery F.C. players
Brighton United F.C. players
Leicester City F.C. players
Linfield F.C. players
Derby County F.C. players
Colne F.C. players
Pre-1950 IFA international footballers